Strange Brew is the soundtrack album to the 1983 cult comedy film, Strange Brew. It was released in August 1983 by PolyGram and Anthem Records of Canada (ANR 1-1042). (Full title: The Adventures of Bob and Doug McKenzie Strange Brew Excerpts from the Original Soundtrack). Unlike most soundtrack tie-ins, the album features continuing comedy sketches by the title duo, Bob and Doug McKenzie. Most of the album is sketches and film dialogue, while the music sampling is usually accompanied by the characters' commentary. The main title theme was performed by Thomas' brother, Ian Thomas. The album was produced by Marc Giacomelli, Rick Shurman and Ian Thomas. 
The album was only available for a short amount of time and currently remains out of print. This is the second and final album released by the duo.

Awards
The soundtrack won the Juno Award for Best Comedy Album in 1984. Bob and Doug accepted the award in person at the awards ceremony, held 5 December 1984, which also happened to be hosted by SCTV alums, Joe Flaherty and Andrea Martin.

Track listing

Motion picture score
As with the soundtrack album, the motion picture score was released for a short amount of time and remains out of print. The album runs approximately 63 minutes in length and was composed and conducted by Charles Fox.

References

External links
 bobanddoug.com

1983 albums
Anthem Records albums
Bob and Doug McKenzie albums
1980s comedy albums
Juno Award for Comedy Album of the Year albums